Rosario Parmegiani (March 12, 1937 – June 13, 2019) was an Italian water polo player who competed in the 1960 Summer Olympics and in the 1964 Summer Olympics.

Parmegiani was a squad member of the Italian Olympic team in the 1956 tournament but did not play in a match.

Four years later he won the gold medal with the Italian team in the Olympic tournament. He played six matches and scored seven goals.

In 1964, he was a member of the Italian water polo team which finished fourth in the Olympic tournament. He played all six matches.

See also
 Italy men's Olympic water polo team records and statistics
 List of Olympic champions in men's water polo
 List of Olympic medalists in water polo (men)

References

External links
 

1937 births
2019 deaths
Water polo players from Naples
Italian male water polo players
Water polo players at the 1956 Summer Olympics
Water polo players at the 1960 Summer Olympics
Water polo players at the 1964 Summer Olympics
Olympic gold medalists for Italy in water polo
Medalists at the 1960 Summer Olympics